Wolfe City Independent School District is a public school district based in Wolfe City, Texas (USA).

Located in Hunt County, the district extends into a small portion of Fannin County.

Schools
Wolfe City High School (Grades 9-12)
Wolfe City Middle School (Grades 6-8)
Wolfe City Elementary School (Grades PK-5)
Wolfe City Early Childhood Learning Center

Academic Achievement 
In 2019, the school district was rated "A" by the Texas Education Agency. In 2020, all school districts were given the "Not Rated" rating due to the COVID-19 pandemic.

Sports 
Wolfe City High School participates in football, volleyball, basketball, baseball, softball, tennis, golf, powerlifting, track and field, and cheerleading. For school years in 2020 - 2022, Wolfe City High School will play in UIL Class 2A.

Construction Projects 
In 2008, the Wolfe City Independent School District broke ground on a multi-million dollar modernization project for the elementary and middle school campuses along with the construction of a new multi-purpose building. The multi-purpose building was set to have a state-of-the-art kitchen and serving area along with a stage for auditorium use. The improvements to the two campuses included new classrooms, tilework, air conditioning upgrades, paint, a new elevator, and covered walkways. The project was estimated to cost $4.65 million dollars and was to be completed in August 2009.

A new gymnasium was completed in December 2010 to be used by Wolfe City Middle School.

References

External links
 

School districts in Hunt County, Texas
School districts in Fannin County, Texas